Sakhnin (or  Sikhnin) is an Arab city in Israel's Northern District. Sakhnin was declared a city in 1995. Sakhnin is home to the largest population of Sufi Muslims within Israel, with approximately 80 members.

Geography 
Sakhnin is built over three hills and is located in a valley surrounded by mountains, the highest one being 602 meters high. Its rural landscape is almost entirely covered by olive and fig groves as well as oregano and sesame shrubs.

History 

Settlement at Sakhnin dates back 3,500 years to its first mention in 1479 BCE by Thutmose II, whose ancient Egyptian records mention it as a centre for production of indigo dye.

Sakhnin is situated on an ancient site, where remains from columns and cisterns have been found. It was mentioned as Sogane, a town fortified in 66, by Josephus. A cistern, excavated near the mosque in the old city centre, revealed pottery fragments dating from the 1st to the 5th century CE.

Haninah ben Teradion, who was arrested by the Roman authorities for heresy (minut), disobeying a decree by Hadrian that forbade the teaching of Jewish law and accepting his martyrdom as the will of heaven, is said to have run a Torah academy there. It may be the village  Kfar Sikhnin referred to in rabbinical accounts of the aftermath of the trial of the tanna Rabbi Eliezer ben Hyrcanus for heresy. Once the case was dismissed Rabbi Akiva came to visit and asked him if he had ever been pleased in hearing some teaching from a heretic. this query prompted Eliezer to recall an encounter on the road of Sepphoris, with a certain Yaakov from Kfar Sikhnin. Yaakov referred to him a teaching from Yeshua ben Pantiri/Yeshu ha-notsri, usually identified as Jesus, which Eliezer admits pleased him.

In 1961 the biblical archaeologist Bellarmino Bagatti, during a visit to the village, was shown a tomb venerated by Christians, Jews and Muslims, which local tradition identified as that of James the Just. On returning to the village, he discovered that restoration had been undertaken and the site renamed the burial place of Rabbi Yehoshua of Sakhnin. Richard Bauckham has raised the possibility that the Yaakov of Sikhnin in accounts of rabbi Eliezer may be James the grandson of Jude.

In the Crusader era, it was known as  Zecanin. In 1174 it was one of the casalia (villages) given to Phillipe le Rous. In 1236 descendants of Phillipe le Rous confirmed the sale of the fief of Saknin.

Ottoman era
In 1596, Sakhnin appeared in Ottoman tax registers as being in the nahiya (subdistrict) of Akka (Acre), part of Safad Sanjak. It had a population of 66 households and 8 bachelors, all Muslim. The villagers paid a fixed tax rate of 20% on various agricultural products, including wheat, barley, olives, cotton, in addition to a water mill; a total of 12,138 akçe.

In 1838, Sakhnin was noted as a Muslim and Christian village in the Shaghur district, located between Safad, Acre and Tiberias. In 1859 the British Consul Rogers estimated the population to be 1,100, and the cultivated area 100 feddans, while in 1875 Victor Guérin found 700 inhabitants, both Muslims and Greek Orthodox Christians.

In 1881, the PEF's Survey of Western Palestine (SWP) described Sakhnin as follows: "A large village of stone and mud, amid fine olive-groves, with a small mosque. The water supply is from a large pool about half a mile to the south-east. The inhabitants are Moslems and Christians". A population list from about 1887 showed that Sakhnin had about 1,915 inhabitants; 1,640 Muslims, 150 Catholic Christians and 125 Greek Christians.

British Mandate era
In the 1922 census of Palestine conducted by the British Mandate authorities, Sakhnin had a population of 1,575; 1,367 Muslims and 208 Christians; 87 Orthodox and 121 Greek Catholic (Melchite). The population increased in the 1931 census to a total of 1,891; 1,688 Muslims, 202 Christians, and 1 Jew, in a total of 400 houses.

In the 1945 statistics, Sakhnin had 2,600 inhabitants; 2310 Muslims and 290 Christians. The total jurisdiction of the village was 70,192 dunams of land. 3,622 dunams were used for plantations and irrigable land, 29,366 dunams for cereals, while 169  dunams were built-up (urban) land.

State of Israel
During the 1948 Arab-Israeli war, Sakhnin surrendered to Israeli forces on July 18, 1948, during Operation Dekel, but was re-captured by Arab forces shortly afterwards. It finally fell without battle during Operation Hiram, 29–31 October 1948. Many of the inhabitants fled north but some stayed and were not expelled by the Israeli soldiers. The town remained under martial law until 1966.

Later that same year, three more civilians were killed during clashes with the police. Two natives of the city were killed in Jerusalem during the al-Aqsa Intifada in 2000.

The Israeli transcription of the Arabic toponym is an orthographic error, writing Sakhnas instead of Sakhnin.

Sports 

In 2003, the town's football club, Bnei Sakhnin, became one of the first Arab teams to play in the Israeli Premier League, the top tier of Israeli football. The following year, the club won the State Cup, and was the first Arab team to do so; consequently, it participated in the UEFA Cup the following season, losing out to Newcastle United. The team received a new home with the 2005 opening of Doha Stadium, funded by the Israeli government and the Qatar National Olympic Committee, whose capital it is named after. The stadium has a capacity of 5,000.

Sakhnin is also the hometown of Abbas Suan, an Israeli international footballer who previously played for Bnei Sakhnin. The town and their soccer team are the subject of the 2010 documentary film After The Cup: Sons of Sakhnin United

On 19 September 2008, Bnei Sakhnin played a game with the Spanish team Deportivo de La Coruña.

See also
 Arab localities in Israel
 Masud Ghnaim
 Arab Museum of Contemporary Art and Heritage

References

Bibliography

External links
Sakhnin municipality site
Welcome To Sakhnin
Survey of Western Palestine, Map 5:  IAA, Wikimedia commons 
'Not quite Zurich' Eretz magazine

Arab localities in Israel
Arab Christian communities in Israel
Cities in Northern District (Israel)
Ancient Jewish settlements of Galilee